The Bay View Houses is a housing project of the New York City Housing Authority in the Canarsie neighborhood of Brooklyn. It has twenty-three, 8-story buildings with 1,609 apartments. The 34.02-acre complex is bordered by Seaview Avenue, East 102nd Street, and Rockaway Parkway.

Development 
Construction on the Bay View Houses began in November 1954 and was completed on June 7, 1956. It was designed for middle-income families to keep these residents from moving to the suburbs. The Bayview Houses was mostly inhabited by low- to middle-income working class New Yorkers.

The development was designed in the superblock style which bounds the property with local roads and without roads crossing. The buildings take up roughly 14% of the site to ensure green space, typical of the time. This design ignores the surrounding environment, particularly the view of Jamaica Bay from the buildings. Located in the center of the development is the Bay View Houses Farm, managed by East New York Farms.


In Progress To Be Converted Into RAD PACT Section 8 Management
The development is currently in the process of becoming converted into RAD PACT Section 8 Management where there will be a Public-private partnership between NYCHA and private companies to manage the development in order to bring in the capital funding needed to revitalize and upgrade the development into better conditions.

Notable residents 

John Brockington (born 1948), former NFL player
Steven Keats (1945–1994), actor 
John Salley (born 1964), former NBA player and the first player to win an NBA championship on three different teams
Howard Schultz (born 1953), former CEO of Starbucks

See also
New York City Housing Authority
List of New York City Housing Authority properties

References

External links
Fact sheet

Residential buildings in Brooklyn
Canarsie, Brooklyn
Public housing in Brooklyn